The 1891 Scottish Cup final was played on 7 February 1891 at the second Hampden Park (now known as Cathkin Park) in Glasgow and was the final of the 18th season of the Scottish Cup. Hearts and Dumbarton contested the match. Hearts won the match 1–0, thanks to a 15th-minute goal from Willie Mason.

Final

Teams

References

External links
 RSSSF: Scottish Cup 1890–91
 Scottish Football Archive
SFA Cup Archive

1891
Cup Final
Dumbarton F.C. matches
Scottish Cup Final 1891
19th century in Glasgow
February 1891 sports events